Chapulineros de Oaxaca is a Mexican football team nicknamed  Los chapulineros (Grasshoppers). The club was founded in 1983 and is based in the state of Oaxaca where it plays its home matches at the Estadio Independiente MRCI. The club has played in the Tercera División, Segunda División, and the Liga de Ascenso. Starting in 2020, they will play in the Liga de Balompié Mexicano. They previously played in the Liga Premier Serie B.

History
The club's origins date back to 1982, when the Benito Juárez Autonomous University of Oaxaca football team began to participate in the Segunda División "B". Two years later, the university bought team Pumas ENEP, a Pumas UNAM reserve team and was renamed as Chapulineros de Oaxaca, playing at Segunda División "A". After this fact, the team wandered between Segunda División "A" and Segunda "B", until 1993 when it won the Second B championship, being the only title of the club so far.

In 1994 the team remains in the Segunda Divisíon after the creation of the Primera División "A", later it became a team affiliated with Toros Neza, to later be managed by the Universidad Regional del Sureste.

For the 2001–02 season, the Grupo Pegaso returns to the Chapulineros to professional football after moving the Lobos UAP franchise to Oaxaca City. The team had bad results and had to play a relegation play-out to remain in the league, which they managed to win and could continue to play in the same division. For the 2003–04 season the team was dissolved again when it was relocated to Tlaxcala City, where it was renamed as Guerreros de Tlaxcala.

In August 2015, the MRCI corporate obtained the Teca UTN franchise, they renamed the team as Chapulineros, moved it to Oaxaca and began to participate in the Liga Premier de Ascenso as of that season. For the 2017–18 season the team is relocated to Serie B de México due to the lack of infrastructure to be able to participate for the promotion to Ascenso MX. In 2018, the team paused its sporting activity because it did not get the endorsement to participate in the league from the FMF.

In 2019 the team returned to compete in the FMF, leaving this federation the following year to join the LBM.

In its first season, the team finished in third place in the regular season with 22 points from seven wins, two draws and one loss. In the championship playoff, Chapulineros eliminated Morelos F.C. and Furia Roja F.C. to reach the final, where they defeated Atlético Veracruz in the penalty shoot-out after tying three goals on the aggregate score, in this way the team of Oaxaca won its first championship in the new competition, as well as being the first champion in LBM history.

Chapulineros de Oaxaca won the LBM championships again in the 2021 and 2022 seasons, making it the most winning team in this league.

Year by year

Past kits

First kit evolution

Players

Current squad

Recent outstanding players
  Alan Cruz
  Jorge Bernal
  Cristian Mazzón
  Marco Antonio Sánchez
  Miguel Ángel Vargas
  Ángel Lemus
  Hugo Omar Sánchez
  José Luis Mendoza
  Ricardo Munguía
  Silvio Rudman

Footnotes

External links
 home page

Football clubs in Oaxaca
Association football clubs established in 1983
1983 establishments in Mexico
Liga Premier de México
Liga de Balompié Mexicano Teams